Carolina, also known as Caroline, was an American Civil War merchant ship that tried to leave Galveston, Texas by breaking through a federal blockade. The ship was last carrying cotton and sank in 1864 in the Gulf of Mexico. On March 9, 2009, contractors looking for debris from Hurricane Ike reported the discovery of the shipwreck after using sonar.

References

Sailing ships
Shipwrecks in the Gulf of Mexico
Shipwrecks of the American Civil War
Maritime incidents in 1864